The 1935 Argentine Primera División was the 44th season of top-flight football in Argentina. There were 18 teams in the tournament, and Boca Juniors was the champion, winning its 9th league title.

Standings

References

Argentine Primera División seasons
Argentine Primera Division
Primera Division